The Fairmont Austin is a 37-story hotel located on 101 Red River St, in Downtown Austin, Texas. Groundbreaking for the project began on November 3, 2014. The Fairmont Austin also features a skyway connection to the Austin Convention Center. 

The Fairmont Austin also features five restaurants: Good things, a coffee shop with quick bites. Rules and Regs, the tapas bar and restaurant on the 7th floor pool deck. Revue, a multi outlet style restaurant modeled after a movie set. Fulton, a craft cocktail bar and restaurant which features live music each and every night. And finally, Garrison, a modern american, post oak, open flame, luxe dining experience.

History
The groundbreaking for the Fairmont Austin was held on November 3, 2014. The hotel was expected to reach completion in late January to early February 2018 but was delayed until March 2018. The hotel opened on March 5, 2018, in time for South by Southwest.

Architecture

The Fairmont Austin was designed by architecture firm Gensler, with interiors furnished by San Francisco-based interior designer Warren Sheets. The hotel features a $6 million 33-foot aerial skyway connecting to the Austin Convention Center, designed by Thomas Phifer. 

The building is topped with a 170-foot lighted spire, the maximum height allowed by the Federal Aviation Administration. The building's crown features a band of color-changing LED lighting, which is often changed for holidays and special events. During periods of low occupancy, the hotel blocks off rooms on the southern side of the building and replaces the lighting in select rooms with color-changing LED bulbs to create images on the building's facade, including the Texas Longhorns logo during University of Texas games, a giant jack-o'-lantern for Halloween, and a wrapped present during Christmas.

See also
List of tallest buildings in Austin, Texas

References

External links

Official site

Skyscraper hotels in Austin, Texas
Gensler buildings